Frontiers is the eighth studio album by the American rock band Journey, released on February 1, 1983 by Columbia Records. This was the band's last album to feature bassist Ross Valory until 1996's Trial by Fire.

The album reached No. 2 on the Billboard 200 chart and would garner four top 40 singles: "After the Fall" (No. 23), "Send Her My Love" (No. 23), "Faithfully" (No. 12), and "Separate Ways (Worlds Apart)" (No. 8), and a rock radio hit in "Chain Reaction". The album would later achieve the RIAA certification of six times platinum.

The album had been sequenced and prepped for pressing when, in a last-minute conference with Journey's A&R man Michael Dillbeck, two songs were pulled from the original lineup, "Ask the Lonely" and "Only the Young". These two tracks were replaced with "Back Talk" and "Troubled Child". "Ask the Lonely" was utilized in the soundtrack for the film Two of a Kind. "Only the Young" would find its way into the Top Ten two years later, as part of the soundtrack of the movie Vision Quest.

The band recorded a song called "All That Really Matters," with keyboardist Jonathan Cain singing lead, during the album sessions. It didn't see release until the 1992 release of the Time3 box set.

Frontiers was the band's highest-charting album in the United Kingdom, reaching No. 6 on the UK Albums Chart in 1983.

Album artwork 
Jim Welch designed the album cover. This was the first album cover since Next that did not employ the talents of Stanley Mouse and Alton Kelley.

Welch, who has been Journey's art designer for more than 30 years (as of 2022), commented: "Frontiers was a subtle shift. Mouse and Kelley were not involved with that cover. My vision for Frontiers was based on "tunnels" and the relativity of time and motion. Light stays the same, but time bends. It was Einstein theories for artist interpretation. The alien in Frontiers wasn't really an alien at all, he was a connection to a higher level of listening to Journey."

Critical reception

In 2005, Frontiers was ranked number 363 in Rock Hard magazine's book The 500 Greatest Rock & Metal Albums of All Time.

Track listing

Personnel
Band members
Steve Perry - lead vocals
Neal Schon - lead guitar, backing vocals
Jonathan Cain - keyboards, rhythm guitar, backing vocals
Ross Valory - bass guitar, backing vocals
Steve Smith - drums, percussion

Additional Musicians
Randy Jackson - bass guitar on "After the Fall"

Production
Mike Stone - producer, engineer, mixing
Kevin Elson - producer, mixing
Wally Buck - assistant engineer
Bob Ludwig - mastering

Charts 
 

Album

Singles

Certifications

References

Journey (band) albums
1983 albums
Columbia Records albums
Albums produced by Mike Stone (record producer)
Albums produced by Kevin Elson